"Through the Iris" is a single released by alternative metal band 10 Years in 2006. It is the second single released and track 8 from their first major release, The Autumn Effect. It was released for radio only, as there was no CD single.

Like the previous single, the song was also originally released on Killing All That Holds You, the band's second independent album, produced by Travis Wyrick. The album was eventually reissued with four acoustic tracks. The acoustic tracks were recorded live by Mike D. for Lakeside Studios. It was track 2 and clocked in at 3:23.

Track listing
 "Through the Iris" – 3:30

Charts

References

2005 songs
2006 singles
10 Years (band) songs
Song recordings produced by Josh Abraham
Universal Records singles
Republic Records singles